Francesco Statuto (born 13 July 1971) is an Italian professional football coach and a former player, being among the top midfielders for Roma during the 1990s. He is in charge as head coach of Serie D club Roma City.

Club career 
Statuto played with A.S. Roma over three periods, beginning from the 1989-90 season, in which he did not however play a single match for the giallorossi. He then went on to join lower division club Casertana, before moving on to Cosenza in 1992 and Serie A hopefuls Udinese in 1993. With Udinese being relegated in the sommer of 1994, Francesco joined capital club AS Roma for the new season. The club ended in a good fifth place being thus qualified for the UEFA Cup. After another fifth-place finish, the club disappointingly finished 12th in the 1996–97 season, and heads started to roll. Spending another half year in Rome, Statuto moved back to former club Udinese for the remainder of the 1997–98 season - finishing third with the Friuli-outfit - one spot ahead of Roma.

For the 1998–99 season, Statuto, who had played extraordinarily well for Udinese, was back with the giallorossi, leading the club to another fifth-place finish in the Serie A, playing alongside a young Francesco Totti. A memorable season for Statuto, which also included a short loanspell at Piacenza, the club he eventually joined fully in the summer of 1999.

He played three seasons for Piacenza, which saw out his career. The three years offered both a relegation to the Serie B and a promotion back to the Serie A with the red and white outfit.

International career 
Statuto earned three caps for the Italy national team in 1995.

Coaching career 
In 2012 Statuto served briefly as the caretaker of Grosseto in Serie B for the two last games of the team.

In July 2022, Statuto returned into management as the new head coach of newly-established Serie D club Roma City.

References

External links 
 

1971 births
Living people
Italian footballers
Italy international footballers
Association football midfielders
Footballers from Rome
Serie A players
Serie B players
A.S. Roma players
Cosenza Calcio 1914 players
Udinese Calcio players
Piacenza Calcio 1919 players
Calcio Padova players
Italian football managers
F.C. Grosseto S.S.D. managers